Royal Air Force Upavon or RAF Upavon is a former RAF station in Wiltshire, England. It was a grass airfield, military flight training school, and administrative headquarters of the Royal Air Force. The station opened in 1912 and closed in 1993, when it was transferred to the British Army and became known as Trenchard Lines.

The station motto was In Principio Et Semper, and translated from Latin means "In the Beginning and Always".

History

Origins and construction

Upavon Airfield was originally created for pilots of the military and naval wings of the newly formed Royal Flying Corps (RFC), and became home to the Army Central Flying School. Captain Godfrey M Paine, RN, became the first commandant, with Major Hugh Trenchard being his assistant. Trenchard later became the chief of air staff, and subsequently became known as the "father of the Royal Air Force".

Early flying developments
During 1913 the first night landing made in England was achieved at Upavon, by Lieutenant Cholmondeley. In May 1914, Winston Churchill, then First Lord of the Admiralty, was a passenger on a flight by a Farman MF.7 biplane while visiting Upavon. Two officers of the CFS at Upavon developed the bomb sight between 1914–1915, and this was used in a very successful manner at the Western Front. The first  Unmanned Aerial Target aircraft were tested on the site on 21 March 1917,  witnessed  by 30–40 allied generals. The officers' mess, a Grade II* listed building, was completed in 1915.

Birth of the Royal Air Force
On 1 April 1918, the Royal Flying Corps (RFC) amalgamated with the Royal Naval Air Service to create the Royal Air Force, and Upavon became Royal Air Force Station Upavon, commonly abbreviated to RAF Upavon. Accordingly, the former RFC Central Flying School became the Central Flying School.

During 1926 the Central Flying School moved from Upavon. At the same time, No.17 (Fighter) Squadron RAF moved to Upavon to join No.3 (Fighter) Squadron RAF, who had been at Upavon since 1924. For the next eight years, the two fighter squadrons developed both night flying and aviation fighting techniques. At the same time, they wooed the public all over the country with impressive air displays. In May 1934, both squadrons left Upavon for RAF Kenley, London, and were replaced at Upavon, for a short time in 1935, by four squadrons from the Fleet Air Arm.

The St. Raphael
On 31 August 1927 Lieutenant Colonel Frederick F. Minchin, known to his colleagues as 'Dan', Captain Leslie Hamilton, and Princess Löwenstein-Wertheim took off from Upavon airfield in a Dutch Fokker F.VIIA named the St. Raphael in a bid to become the first aviators to cross the Atlantic from east to west. The aircraft was never seen again and the fate of Minchin, Hamilton and Löwenstein-Wertheim remains a mystery.

Second World War
During August 1935, the Central Flying School was to return to Upavon and stayed there until it moved to RAF Little Rissington in Gloucestershire in April 1942. During this crucial period, the school's primary role was to train and supply flight instructors to the now increasing number of military flying schools. King George VI visited Upavon during the Second World War.

Post-war
Upavon became home to headquarters No. 38 Group in 1946 and home to headquarters RAF Transport Command in 1951. A new headquarters building for Transport Command was completed in the 1960s. On 16 June 1962, Upavon held a static and flying display, attended by Prince Philip, to mark the 50th anniversary of the Royal Flying Corps. Transport Command was renamed Air Support Command on 1 August 1967.

With the contraction of the RAF, Air Support Command only lasted a short time as a command, and it was absorbed into Strike Command on 1 September 1972. The grass runway was not wholly appropriate for heavy fixed-wing aircraft, nor any kind of jet aircraft, and so the airfield was used as an administrative base and also became the home of No. 622 Volunteer Gliding Squadron, part of the Air Training Corps, who used static winch-launched gliders.

Post-RAF use 
As a result of major reorganisation of the Royal Air Force in the early 1990s, RAF Upavon became surplus to requirements, and the RAF was to permanently withdraw from Upavon. On 3 August 1993, the RAF handed over the site to the British Army and the airfield became a British Army garrison called Trenchard Lines. When the army first moved into Upavon, it became home to Headquarters Doctrine & Training. On 30 January 1995, it then became Headquarters Adjutant General.

In April 2008 HQ Adjutant General was absorbed within the newly formed HQ Land Forces under 'Project Hyperion'. The new merged HQ LF was to be at Andover to use surplus real estate made available by Defence Equipment and Support. The two organisations merged organisationally on 1 April 2008, but preparing the Marlborough Lines buildings at Andover for physical co-location was not expected to be possible before 2010. The site is now home to the headquarters of Army Recruiting and Initial Training Command.

Station commanders

Royal Flying Corps

Royal Air Force

Aircraft

 Farman MF.7 biplane
 Fokker E.III
 Grob 103 Viking TX.1 – No. 622 Volunteer Gliding Squadron

Units
Units based at RAF Upavon included:

See also
Royal Air Force station
List of former Royal Air Force stations

References

Sources

External links

622 Volunteer Gliding Squadron
Wyvern Gliding Club

Buildings and structures in Wiltshire
Gliderports in the United Kingdom
Installations of the British Army
Military installations closed in 1993
Military installations established in 1912
Royal Flying Corps airfields
Royal Air Force stations in Wiltshire
Royal Air Force stations of World War II in the United Kingdom
1912 establishments in the United Kingdom